Brazos is an unincorporated community in Palo Pinto County, Texas, United States.

Public education in the community is provided by the Santo Independent School District.

References

External links
 

Unincorporated communities in Palo Pinto County, Texas
Unincorporated communities in Texas